Elazar "Eli" Dasa (or Eliezer, ; born 3 December 1992) is an Israeli professional footballer who plays as a right-back for Russian club Dynamo Moscow and vice-captains the Israel national team. He is the first captain of Israel to be of Ethiopian-Jewish origin.

Early life
Dasa was born in Netanya, Israel, to an Ethiopian-Jewish family. He is the second Israeli of Ethiopian-Jewish background to play for the Israel national football team. His younger brother Or Dasa is a footballer who plays for Portuguese club Arouca, who also played for the Israel U-21 national team.

Club career
On 31 July 2010, Dasa made his debut in Beitar Jerusalem F.C. during a Toto Cup match against Hapoel Ashkelon. On 12 September 2012, Dasa scored the first goal in his senior career during a league match against Hapoel Be'er Sheva.

On 9 July 2015, he made his first international match debut in a 2–1 victory over Kazakh team FC Ordabasy in the 2015–16 UEFA Europa League qualification and played 90 minutes.

On 10 August 2015, Dasa signed for four years with Israeli champions Maccabi Tel Aviv.

On 7 September 2022, Dasa signed a contract with Russian Premier League club Dynamo Moscow for the term of two years with an option to extend for one more year.

International career

Dasa played in the Israel under-21 team since 2010. He was a part of the Israeli team for the 2013 UEFA European Under-21 Championship, in Israel.

In 2015, he was called up by the national coach Eli Guttman for the senior Israel national team. Dasa made his debut in the senior national team against Andorra in a 4–0 win, on 3 September 2015. Dasa debuted as the Israeli line-up captain on 26 March 2022, in a friendly away match against Germany; thus becoming the first senior captain of Israel to be of Ethiopian-Jewish origin.

Career statistics

Club

International

Honours
Maccabi Tel Aviv
 Israeli Premier League: 2018–19
 Israeli Toto Cup: 2017–18, 2018–19

References

External links
 
 

1992 births
Living people
Footballers from Ness Ziona
Israeli footballers
Association football fullbacks
Beitar Jerusalem F.C. players
Maccabi Tel Aviv F.C. players
SBV Vitesse players
FC Dynamo Moscow players
Israeli Premier League players
Eredivisie players
Russian Premier League players
Israel under-21 international footballers
Israel international footballers
Israeli expatriate footballers
Israeli expatriate sportspeople in the Netherlands
Expatriate footballers in the Netherlands
Israeli expatriate sportspeople in Russia
Expatriate footballers in Russia
Jewish Israeli sportspeople
Jewish footballers
Israeli people of Ethiopian-Jewish descent